Najeh Braham (born 20 May 1977) is a Tunisian retired footballer and current manager.

Club career
Born in Bembla, Tunisia, Braham began his playing career with Tunisian side US Monastir. His first club in Germany was 1. SC Göttingen 05. In 2001, Braham moved to Regionalliga Süd side Eintracht Trier, but only played in six matches in his first season. After Trier's promotion to 2. Bundesliga, the club looked to off-load him, but no interest was shown. In the next season, Braham had his breakthrough with Trier, scoring 13 goals in 29 matches and securing a mid-table finish for the club. However, in the following season, Braham hit a dry spell, not scoring once in all his 15 matches, leading to his transfer to newly promoted Rot-Weiß Erfurt in 2004. But at Erfurt, Braham's problems continued, he only played in 12 matches, scoring once. Eventually the rest of the team declared itself displeased by Braham's egoistical way of playing, and he moved back to Eintracht Trier. Trier had been relegated to Regionalliga Süd, and Braham's 12 goals in 24 matches could not prevent the club from being relegated to the tier IV Oberliga Südwest.

From the 2006–07 season onwards, Braham played for Regionalliga Süd side Sportfreunde Siegen, but played for the reserves in the tier V Verbandsliga most of the time. In the winter break of the 2007–08 season his contract was terminated, and on 22 January 2008 he signed for 1. FC Magdeburg. Despite the club missing out on qualification for the newly created 3. Liga, Braham extended his contract until 2011, but left the club on 13 July 2009 to sign with Erzgebirge Aue, after Magdeburg had told the player that he no longer played a role in their plans.

International career
Braham has had 14 caps for Tunisia, he was part of the Tunisia squad that won the 2004 edition of the African Cup of Nations, playing in two matches and scoring once.

Coaching career
In February 2014, Braham took over as manager at Göttingen 05. He was released by the club in October 2014.

Honours
Tunisia
 Africa Cup of Nations: 2004

References

1977 births
Living people
People from Monastir Governorate
Tunisian footballers
Association football forwards
Tunisia international footballers
2004 African Cup of Nations players
2. Bundesliga players
3. Liga players
US Monastir (football) players
1. FC Magdeburg players
FC Rot-Weiß Erfurt players
SV Eintracht Trier 05 players
FC Erzgebirge Aue players
Tunisian football managers
Tunisian expatriate footballers
Tunisian expatriate football managers
Tunisian expatriate sportspeople in Germany
Expatriate footballers in Germany
Expatriate football managers in Germany